Lee Myung-hoon (born February 2, 1989) is a South Korean actor and comedian.

Filmography

Television series

Variety show

References

External links 

 

South Korean male television actors
South Korean male comedians
1989 births
Living people